The 1995 Kroger St. Jude International is a men's ATP tennis tournament held in Memphis, Tennessee, United States. The event was part of the Championship Series of the 1995 ATP Tour. It was the 25th edition of the tournament and was played on indoor hard courts and was held from February 13 through February 19, 1995.

Todd Martin won his 1st title of the year, and 4th of his career. It was his second win at Memphis, also winning in 1994.

Finals

Singles

 Todd Martin defeated  Paul Haarhuis 7–6(7–2), 6–4

Doubles

 Jared Palmer /  Richey Reneberg defeated  Tommy Ho /  Brett Steven 4–6, 7–6, 6–1

References

External links
 ITF tournament edition details
 Official tournament website

Kroger St. Jude International
Sports in Memphis, Tennessee
U.S. National Indoor Championships
Kroger St. Jude International
Kroger St. Jude International
Kroger St. Jude International